The Khamseh Arabs are an Arab nomadic and pastoral tribe of Fars Province in Iran. They are a part of the Khamseh confederation. They speak a dialect of Gulf Arabic. Their population numbers about 1000.

Branches 
The two Arab tribes in Fars Province are Sheybani and Jabbareh.

Sheibani 
The Sheybani (or Sheibani) migrated to Iran before the other group. At first they settled in Khorasan and later migrated to Fars district. A group of them live in Sheyban city of Bavi County in Khuzestan.

Jabbareh 
The Jabbareh settled in Fars know themselves as the descendants of Jabir ibn Abd Allah, a companion of prophet Muhammad. Their ancestor Sheikh Jinaah migrated to Fars and married a Sheybani girl, naming his descendants "Jabbareh".

Language 
Khamseh Arabs speak a dialect of Gulf Arabic that adopted many Persian words. Their language is hard for other Arabic speakers to understand.

Religion 
Khamseh Arabs are mostly Shia Muslims but Sunni Minorities are also present.

See also 
Iranian Arabs

References

Sources 
 Ali Mohammad Najafi. Great Men of Arab Tribe and the Tribes
 Ali Mohammad Najafi. Khamseh Tribes happenings
 The history of Khamseh Arabs of Fars

Ethnic groups in Iran
Fars Province
Iranian Arab people by location
Tribes of Arabia